Eucosma essexana, the Essex phaneta moth, is a species of tortricid moth in the family Tortricidae.

The MONA or Hodges number for Eucosma essexana is 2910.

References

Further reading

External links

 
 

Eucosmini
Moths described in 1907